This is a list of notable people who had anorexia nervosa. Often simply known as anorexia, this is an eating disorder which is characterized by an obsessive fear of gaining weight, weight loss, and distorted body image. People with anorexia usually restrict their caloric intake and limit types of food they eat. Some people are also known to exercise excessively, purge with laxatives or vomiting and/or binge eat. Eating disorders are known to be more common in people whose occupations involve significant focus on appearance, like athletes or celebrities.

Dance and sport
Molly Bartrip (English footballer)
Christy Henrich (American gymnast)
François Imbeau-Dulac (Canadian diver)
Gelsey Kirkland (American ballet dancer)
Yulia Lipnitskaya (Russian figure skater)
Tina Nordlund (Swedish footballer)

Music

Karen Carpenter (American singer, formerly of The Carpenters), died in February 1983 at age 32
Melanie C (British singer, formerly of the Spice Girls)
Nicole Dollanganger (Canadian singer)
Richey Edwards (Welsh lyricist and rhythm guitarist of the Manic Street Preachers), disappeared in February 1995 at age 27
Caleb Followill (American musician, Kings of Leon)
Daniel Johns (Australian rock musician)
Dolores O'Riordan (Irish singer/songwriter, The Cranberries), died in January 2018 at age 46
Diana Ross (American singer)
Monica Sintra (Portuguese singer)
Jade Thirlwall (British singer in the girl band Little Mix)
Amy Winehouse (British singer-songwriter), died in July 2011 at age 27
Taylor Swift (American musician)
Lindsey Stirling (American musician)
Florence Welch (British singer, Florence and the Machine)

Literature
Robbie Coburn (Australian poet)
Louise Glück (American poet)
Michael Krasnow (American author) died October 1997, aged 28, author of My Life as a Male Anorexic.
Marya Hornbacher (American author), author of Wasted: A Memoir of Anorexia and Bulimia

Media 
Isabelle Caro (French model)
Eugenia Cooney (American YouTuber) 
Lily-Rose Depp (French-American actress)
Elisa Donovan (American actress)
Nikki DuBose (American model and actress)
Susan Dey (American actress)
Christopher Eccleston (British actor)
Sally Field (American actress)
Jane Fonda (American actress)
Tracey Gold (American actress)
Nikki Grahame (British television personality)
Lucy Hale (American actress of the show Pretty Little Liars)
Felicity Huffman (American actress)
Kate Dillon Levin (American model)
Stacy London (Fashion stylist from What Not to Wear)
Evanna Lynch (Irish actress of the Harry Potter movies)
Paula Meronek (American reality TV personality)
Barbara Niven (American actress)
Mary-Kate Olsen (American actress)
Billie Piper (British actress, singer)
 Dennis Quaid (American actor)
Gilda Radner (American actress)
Crystal Renn (American model)
Christina Ricci (American actress)
Portia de Rossi (Australian actress)
Brittany Snow (American actress)
 Richard Simmons (American fitness guru, actor, and comedian)
Angelina Jolie (American actress)
Calista Flockhart (American actress)
Sarah Jane Dias, (Indian actress)
Jaiden Animations, (American YouTuber)
Emma Chamberlain (Youtuber)

Other public figures
Allegra Versace (heiress to the Versace fashion brand, daughter of Donatella Versace)
Victoria, Crown Princess of Sweden (heiress to the Swedish royal throne)
Shelli Yoder (American politician)
Empress Elisabeth of Austria (Empress of Austria and Queen of Hungary)

See also 
List of people with bulimia nervosa
List of deaths from anorexia nervosa

References

Anorexia nervosa
Anorexia nervosa